Yunyang may refer to:

 Yunyang County, Chongqing
 Yunyang District, Shiyan, Hubei